His Dark Materials may refer to:

 His Dark Materials, fantasy novel trilogy by Philip Pullman
 Northern Lights (Pullman novel), published as The Golden Compass in the United States, first novel in Pullman's trilogy, published in 1995
 The Subtle Knife, second novel in Pullman's trilogy, published in 1997
 The Amber Spyglass, third novel in Pullman's trilogy, published in 2000
 His Dark Materials (play), play adaptation by Nicholas Wright which premiered in 2003
 His Dark Materials (TV series), television series adaptation which premiered in 2019

See also
 The Golden Compass (film), 2007 film adaptation of Northern Lights
 The Golden Compass (video game), 2007 video game adaptation of the novel